A halachic state (Medinat Halakha) is a Jewish state governed by halakha, Jewish religious law.

Public opinion 

An opinion poll released in March 2016 by the Pew Research Center found high support for a halachic state among religious Israeli Jews. The poll found that 86% of Israeli Haredi Jews and 69% of non-Haredi religious Jews support making halakha Israel's legal code while 57% of traditional Jews and 90% of secular Jews oppose such a move. At the time, the Haredi (ultra-orthodox Jews) constituted 8% of all Israelis, the Dati (orthodox Jews) 10%, the Masorti (traditional Jews) 23%, and the Hiloni (secular Jews) 40%. There was a majority agreement amongst all Israeli Jewish groups that Israel could be both a Jewish and democratic state. When asked whether they would prefer democratic principles or halakha (religious law) if the two were ever in conflict, 62% of all Israeli Jews combined favoured democratic principles; however, preference for halakha was very high amongst the Haredim (89%), while very low amongst secular Jews (1%).

Support of Jewish religious leaders 
Menachem Mendel Schneerson advocated the transformation of Israel into a halachic state even before the Messiah comes.

Support of Knesset members and Israeli justices 
In 2009, Justice Minister Yaakov Neeman stated that "step by step, Torah law will become the binding law in the State of Israel. We have to reinstate the traditions of our forefathers, the teaching of the rabbis of the ages, because these offer a solution to all the issues we are dealing with today". He later retracted his statement. According to 2002 Israel Prize winner Nahum Rakover, who received the Yakir Yerushalayim prize for his research on the use of Jewish law in the legal system, Neeman's opinion was nothing new. He said that the idea is supported in the Foundations of Law Act, passed in 1980, which encourages judges to use Jewish law in their decisions. Yitzhak Kahan, former president of the Israeli Supreme Court, recommended that Jewish law be implemented even in cases of an existing precedent, although his opinion was not accepted and former justice ministers Shmuel Tamir and Moshe Nissim advocated teaching judges and lawyers Jewish law to provide them with the necessary knowledge to implement the law.

In June 2019, Tkuma leader Bezalel Smotrich campaigned for the Ministry of Justice, saying that he sought the portfolio to "restore the Torah justice system". Prime Minister Benjamin Netanyahu distanced himself from the comments and appointed openly gay MK Amir Ohana to the post.

In August 2019, Smotrich stated: "We [Orthodox Jews] all would want the State of Israel to be run according to the Torah and Jewish law, it's just that we can't because there are people who think differently from us, and we have to get along with them."

National identity bill 
In 2014, Israel's cabinet advanced the Nation-State Bill, which would define Israel as "the nation-state of the Jewish people" and also said that Jewish law would be a "source of inspiration" for the Knesset. This was seen by non-Orthodox Jews as a step toward enforcing Orthodox halakha as the law of the land. However, the final version of the law did not include this proposed clause.

See also 
 Christian state
 Islamic state
 State of Judea
 Theocracy
 Theonomy

References 

Judaism and government
Kahanism
Land of Israel
Politics of Israel
Religious Zionism
Theocracy